Hydroginella is a genus of marginellid  minute sea snails, marine gastropod mollusks in the subfamily Austroginellinae of the family Marginellidae, the margin snails.

Hydroginella caledonica (Jousseaume, 1876) can parasitize sleeping fishes of the families  Scaridae, Serranidae and Pomacentridae at coral reefs in New Caledonia by night. This snail is able to inserts its proboscis in the fish flesh and probably pumps some body fluids.

Species
Species within the genus Hydroginella include:
 Hydroginella agulhasensis (Thiele, 1925)
 Hydroginella angustata Boyer, Wakefield & McCleery, 2003
 Hydroginella bullata Boyer, Wakefield & McCleery, 2003
 Hydroginella caledonica (Jousseaume, 1877)
 Hydroginella chiapponii T. Cossignani & Lorenz, 2021
 Hydroginella columnaria (Hedley & May, 1908)
 Hydroginella cypraeaformis Boyer, 2015
 Hydroginella dedicata Boyer, 2018
 Hydroginella delessertiana (Récluz, 1841)
 Hydroginella dispersa Laseron, 1957
 Hydroginella dufresnei Boyer, 2015
 Hydroginella fascicula (Laseron, 1957)
 Hydroginella galatea Lussi & Smith, 1999
 Hydroginella gemella Boyer, 2001
 Hydroginella guttula (G. B. Sowerby I, 1832)
 Hydroginella limata (Ma, 1994)
 Hydroginella marina Lorenz & Kostin, 2007
 Hydroginella marionae Boyer, 2015
 Hydroginella mixta (Petterd, 1884)
 Hydroginella musorstomi Boyer, Wakefield & McCleery, 2003
 Hydroginella osteri (Jousseaume, 1875)
 Hydroginella richeri Boyer, 2001
 Hydroginella rugosa Boyer, Wakefield & McCleery, 2003
 Hydroginella scintilla (Jousseaume, 1875)
 Hydroginella sordida (Reeve, 1865)
 Hydroginella sterbai T. Cossignani & Lorenz, 2021
 Hydroginella superstes (Laseron, 1957)
 Hydroginella tridentata (Tate, 1878)
 Hydroginella unica Boyer, Wakefield & McCleery, 2003
 Hydroginella vincentiana (Cotton, 1944)
 Hydroginella vitiensis Boyer, Wakefield & McCleery, 2003
 Hydroginella wareni Boyer, Wakefield & McCleery, 2003
Species brought into synonymy
 Hydroginella dawnbrinkae Massier, 1993: synonym of Hydroginella agulhasensis (Thiele, 1925)
 Hydroginella electrina (G. B. Sowerby III, 1892): synonym of Hyalina electrina (G. B. Sowerby III, 1892)
 Hydroginella roselineae Cossignani, 2009: synonym of Hydroginella scintilla (Jousseaume, 1875)
 Hydroginella tropica Laseron, 1957: synonym of Dentimargo tropicus (Laseron, 1957)
 Hydroginella tuii Cossignani, 2001: synonym of Serrata tuii (T. Cossignani, 2001) (original combination)

References

 Laseron C.F. (1957). A new classification of the Australian Marginellidae (Mollusca), with a review of species from the Solanderian and Dampierian zoogeographical provinces. Australian Journal of Marine and Freshwater Research. 8(3): 274–311.
 Boyer, F., Wakefield, A., McCleery, T., 2003. The genus Hydroginella (Caenogastropoda: Marginellidae) at bathyal levels from the Fiji Islands. Novapex 4(2-3): 67-77
 Cossignani T. (2006). Marginellidae & Cystiscidae of the World. L'Informatore Piceno. 408pp.

Marginellidae